Statistics of Third Division Football Tournament in the 2013 season. Tournament started on August 19.

Teams
51 teams are competition in the 2013 Third Division Football Tournament, and these teams were divided into 17 groups of 3 teams. Winner of each group and the best 1 team among the group runners-up will be advanced into the second round. Between the 18 teams in the second round, a knock out format will be used.

Group 1
Our Recreation Club
Kuda Henveyru United
Club Middle Bros

Group 2
Tent Sports Club
Zeal Sports Club
Teenage Juniors

Group 3
Maamigili Youth Recreation Club
LQ Sports
Club 010

Group 4
Youth Revolution Club
Thoddoo Football Club
Raising Stars for Vilufushi Recreation

Group 5
Society Alifushi for Youth
Vidha
Lagoons Sports Club

Group 6
Sports Club Veloxia
Huravee Inivative for Youth
Falcon Sports Club

Group 7
Naivadhoo Trainers Sports Club
Biss Buru Sports
Decagon Sports Club

Group 8
Kelaa Nalhi Sports
Sports Club Rivalsa
Buru Sports

Group 9
Ilhaar
Club Amigos
Veyru Sports Club

Group 10
Club PK
West Sports Club
The Futsal Town

Group 11
Muiveyo Friends Club
Stelco Recreation Club
MS Helping Hand Sports Academy

Group 12
Red Line Club
Nazaki Sports
Vaikaradhoo Football Club

Group 13
Sent Sports Club
The Vakko Sports Club
UN Friends

Group 14
Hinnavaru Youth Society
CBL Sports
Sealand Sports Club

Group 15
Club New Oceans
New Star Sports Club
Offu Football Club

Group 16
LT Sports
Aim
Valiant Sports Club

Group 17
Fiyoree Sports Club
TC Sports
The Bows Sports Club

Group stage

Group 1

Group 2

Group 3

Group 4

Group 5

Group 6

Group 7

Group 8

Group 9

Group 10

Final

Awards

References

Maldivian Third Division Football Tournament seasons
3